Zimna Wódka (translation of German: Cold Water) is a village in the administrative district of Gmina Ujazd, within Strzelce County, Opole Voivodeship, in south-western Poland. The village was mentioned in 1223.

On 15 August 2008, the 2008 Poland tornado outbreak hit Zimna Wódka and damaged 15 buildings.

The village has a population of 720.

References

Villages in Strzelce County